George Brediman or Bredyman (died 1580) was an English courtier serving Mary I of England and Elizabeth I. Brediman was a groom of the privy chamber. His wife, Edith Brediman, was a chamberer at court.

Mary I of England
Mary made Brediman Keeper of the Royal Park of Freemantle near Hannington and Kingsclere with an allowance to feed the wild animals in winter. She gave him various rewards, including, in 1557, the manor of Podington, a part of the Honour of Ampthill, and a lease of Brook Hall at Tolleshunt Knights. Brediman was granted the custody and ward of Edmund Brockelsby (died 1565), heir of the manor of Glentworth in July 1557, and was granted the custom duties from the markets and fairs of three Welsh border townships, Builth, Presteigne, and Elvell.

Mary also allowed Brediman to use some verdure tapestry of the "broad bloom" with birds and apples and another suite of verdure featuring roses and pomegranates in the corners. The pomegranate was an emblem of Catherine of Aragon. The rose and pomegranate borders may have been produced by Cornelius van der Strete. The tapestry was listed in the inventory of Henry VIII.

In 1556, he married Edith Brocas or Brokwesse (died 1590), one of Mary's chamberers. She was rewarded for attending Mary during her final illness on 28 October 1558. She signed her name in a Book of Hours which had once belonged to Henry VII, writing under an illustration for the Office of the Dead:In all tyme of neccessitye: with your prayer remember meEdeth Bredyman

Elizabeth I
Mary I made him Keeper of Westminster Palace, and York Place, with the houses occupied by the armourer Hans Hunter and the goldsmith Everard Everdyes, the gardens and orchards, and a tennis court. He continued as Keeper for Elizabeth I. This included responsibility for the Wardrobe of Robes. Several royal warrants directed to Brediman survive, referring both to the wardrobe at Whitehall or at Westminster. At this time, the same store was meant. He issued textiles for revels, to Katherine Astley for the queen's use, and to the queen's tailor Walter Fyshe.

In October 1559, Brediman sent £3000 to Ralph Sadler at Berwick-upon-Tweed. Sadler was to use the money to reward any Scottish people who might further peace with England.

Brediman supplied cloth for the costumes used in The Masque of Amazons performed at Richmond Palace on 11 January 1579.

George Brediman died in 1580. Thomas Knyvet became Keeper of Westminster Palace and the Wardrobe of Robes.

He was survived by his wife Edith, who lived at Tingrith, and a son Edmund. George Brediman was buried at St Martin-in-the-Fields, where his son Edmund had been baptised in 1561, and the previous keeper of Westminster Palace, Arthur Sturton, was buried in 1557. Edith Brediman was buried at St Edmund's Chapel in Westminster Abbey.

References

Reference
 British Library Add MS 6362 f.40, Warrant for Edith Brediman for "her watching and other pains taking in time of our sickness", October 1558

Court of Mary I of England
Court of Elizabeth I
Grooms of the Chamber
1580 deaths
Burials at Westminster Abbey